Elunetru is the object placed in the sanctum sanctorum of the worship centres of Ayyavazhi. The elunetru is a compiled structure of flame shaped copper, a saffron cloth and separate garlands made of rudraksha  and flowers. The saffron cloth is wrapped on the perpendicularly placed flame-shaped copper, which appears like a seat, on which the separate garlands made of rudraksha and flowers are placed around. In Ayyavazhi, this is placed instead of the idol. This was placed in the belief that humans are too knowledge-less to identify the form of God. But it is comfortable to all devotees when symbolized. And so on the Elunetru, a seat was provided for the Formless God.

See also
List of Ayyavazhi-related articles

Ayyavazhi